Sándor Rónai (born 22 November 1988) is a Hungarian politician, who was nominated to the third place of the Democratic Coalition's European Parliament list, afterwards in the 2019 election, he was elected to the European Parliament. 

In 2022, Sándor joined the Committee of Inquiry to investigate the use of Pegasus and equivalent surveillance spyware. In addition to his committee assignments, he is part of the European Parliament Intergroup on Climate Change, Biodiversity and Sustainable Development.

See also 
 List of members of the European Parliament for Hungary, 2019–2024

References 

Democratic Coalition (Hungary) MEPs
1988 births
Eötvös Loránd University alumni
Living people
MEPs for Hungary 2019–2024